is a Japanese multimedia franchise conceived by software and 3D character studio Galat. The project involves Japanese idols living in Japan in the near future. A video game for the PlayStation Vita was released in April 2015. An anime television series aired in Japan between July and September 2015. A web comic is also planned for release.

Characters

Hoshi Kokujō

Company President

Music
Opening Theme
Venus Drive!! by Sawako Hata & Manami Himesaki
Insert Song
Venus Drive!! CLIMAX FinalBattle Version by Sawako Hata

References

External links
 

2015 video games
Anime television series based on video games
Funimation
Japan-exclusive video games
Japanese idols in anime and manga
Mass media franchises
Nomad (company)
PlayStation Vita games
PlayStation Vita-only games
Video games developed in Japan